Quel enfer! (French for "What Hell!") is the second studio album by the French pop rock duo Niagara. It came out in 1988 on Polydor.

Like all four of the band's studio albums, Quel enfer! was certified Gold in France.

Critical reception 
In 2010, the French edition of the Rolling Stone magazine put the album at no. 99 in its top 100 list of French rock albums.

Track listing

References 

Niagara (band) albums
1988 albums
Polydor Records albums